The Quincy-Hannibal, IL-MO Combined Statistical Area, as defined by the United States Census Bureau, is an area consisting of one county in western Illinois and three counties in northeast Missouri, anchored by the cities of Quincy and Hannibal.

As of the 2020 census, the μSA had a population of 75,769.

Counties
In Illinois
Adams
In Missouri
Lewis
Marion
Ralls

Communities
All populations are based on the 2012 population estimates.

Anchor Cities
Quincy Pop: 40,798
Hannibal Pop: 17,814

Places with 1,000 to 5,000 inhabitants
Vandalia (partial) Pop: 4,017 (~2,000 are inmates at a local prison)
Palmyra Pop: 3,610
Monroe City (partial) Pop: 2,485
Canton Pop: 2,376
Camp Point Pop: 1,129
Payson Pop: 1,020

Places with 500 to 1,000 inhabitants
New London Pop: 981
Mendon Pop: 948
La Grange Pop: 931
Clayton Pop: 704
Perry Pop: 702
La Belle Pop: 656
Golden Pop: 641
Ursa Pop: 626
Lewistown Pop: 530
Liberty Pop: 516
Center Pop: 512

Places with less than 500 inhabitants
Ewing Pop: 452
Loraine Pop: 313
Plainville Pop: 264
Rennselaer Pop: 231
Lima Pop: 163
Coatsburg Pop: 147
Columbus Pop: 99
Monticello Pop: 98
La Prairie Pop: 47

Unincorporated places
Beverly
Bigneck also spelled Big Neck
Burton
Durham
Fall Creek
Fowler
Hickory Grove
Kellerville
Kingston
Marblehead
Marcelline
Maywood
Meyer
North Quincy
Paloma
Philadelphia
Richfield
Steffenville
Taylor
West Quincy
Williamstown

Demographics
As of the census of 2000, there were 78,771 people, 30,816 households, and 20,705 families residing within the μSA. The racial makeup of the μSA was 95.21% White, 3.00% African American, 0.16% Native American, 0.37% Asian, 0.01% Pacific Islander, 0.33% from other races, and 0.92% from two or more races. Hispanic or Latino of any race were 0.82% of the population.

The median income for a household in the μSA was $32,718, and the median income for a family was $39,937. Males had a median income of $29,475 versus $20,381 for females. The per capita income for the μSA was $16,320.

In 2015 Quincy, Illinois was named as a finalist for the All-American City.

Education
Quincy, IL is home to institutions of higher education including John Wood Community College, and Quincy University.

See also
Illinois statistical areas
Hannibal, Missouri micropolitan area
Greater St. Louis

References

External links
 Census 

 
Geography of Adams County, Illinois
Lewis County, Missouri
Micropolitan areas of Illinois
Micropolitan areas of Missouri